Dmitriyevka is a rural locality (a selo) in Pochepskoye Rural Settlement, Liskinsky District, Voronezh Oblast, Russia. The population was 262 as of 2010. There are 3 streets.

Geography 
Dmitriyevka is located 29 km north of Liski (the district's administrative centre) by road. Pochepskoye is the nearest rural locality.

References 

Rural localities in Liskinsky District